Jailbirds is a 1996 German comedy film directed by Detlev Buck.

Plot
Prison warden Dr. Fazetti (Leander Haußmann) is confident about having found a striking new concept for the rehabilitation of prisoners by offering them the chance to take a break from their sentence if only they can find a trustworthy woman who takes care of them and vouches for them. The convicts Steinbock (Til Schweiger) and Hammer-Gerd (Detlev Buck) succeed in doing so. However, since they are tough guys stamped by prison fights they have their issues when it comes to discipline and it is particularly hard for them to have a lady as boss. However, Steinbock falls in love with Emilia (Marie Bäumer) and Hammer-Gerd promotes Maren's career as a singer. (Heike Makatsch, who played Maren, would later in 2009 play the German actress and singer Hildegard Knef in a biopic called Hilde.) Eventually they have go back behind bars but Emilia and Maren are now waiting for them.

Reception
The film was awarded a Bambi and a Jupiter as best German film of the year. Heike Makatsch, a TV presenter in her first role, was given a Bavarian Film Award as best actress. The film also received a Goldene Leinwand (Golden Screen) for its results at the German box office, where it had 3.3 million admissions and was the second most popular German film of the year.

References

External links
 

1996 films
1990s German-language films
German prison films
Prison comedy films
1990s German films
Films directed by Detlev Buck